Cebrenii is the name of a Thracian tribe, they are mentioned by Polyaenus and Strabo.

References

See also
List of Thracian tribes

Ancient tribes in Thrace
Ancient tribes in the Balkans
Thracian tribes